The Legacy is the debut studio album by American thrash metal band Testament. It was released on April 21, 1987.

Background
Prior to the album's recording in January 1987, Testament was known as Legacy. Their lineup consisted of singer Steve "Zetro" Souza, guitarists Alex Skolnick and Eric Peterson, bassist Greg Christian and drummer Louie Clemente. Singer Chuck Billy was a member of another local band named Guilt. He had performed with Legacy on a few occasions and was asked to become the new singer after Souza left to join Exodus.

About a month prior to the release of The Legacy, the band changed their name to Testament after finding out that there was a jazz band named Legacy. The Testament name was suggested by Billy Milano (from S.O.D. and M.O.D.), who was a friend of the band in the early days.

This was the only Testament album to feature songwriting contributions from Souza, who was credited as the co-writer of all the songs, except for "C.O.T.L.O.D." and "Do or Die", which were co-written by original Legacy singer Derrick Ramirez and Billy respectively. The closing track, "Apocalyptic City", was written by Skolnick and Peterson.

The album was recorded and mixed at Pyramid Sound Studios in Ithaca, New York, and mastered at Frankford Wayne Mastering Labs in New York City.

Touring and promotion
In support of The Legacy, Testament went on a worldwide tour from June 1987 to April 1988. During the American leg of their tour, they were the opening act for Anthrax on the Among the Living tour, toured through the South and the East Coast with Overkill and played two shows in Northern California with Megadeth. After an appearance at Dynamo Open Air in June 1987 (recorded for the live EP Live at Eindhoven), Testament embarked on their first tour of Europe as the opening act for Anthrax. Touring for The Legacy ended in April 1988, shortly before the release of The New Order.

Reception and awards

The Legacy received favorable reviews by music critics. AllMusic's Alex Henderson rated the album four-and-a-half stars out of five, and said that it saw Testament earn respect in "thrash circles" and called it "a relentlessly heavy and promising effort focusing on such subjects as the occult, witchcraft, nuclear war, and global destruction." Henderson also praised Alex Perialas' production on The Legacy as "superb -- well respected in metal circles", and added that Perialas had "obviously encouraged Testament to play hard and let it rip." Adam McCann of Metal Digest wrote, "If you're going to get out there and make a statement, then The Legacy is a way to establish your erm… legacy. This was thrash metal right to its core, it was full of passion and integrity that was starting to drift away from those bands which had become more established and signed to major labels. Even now, The Legacy sounds great with tracks like 'Apocalyptic City', 'The Haunting' and 'Burnt Offerings' leading the charge and although the production wasn't fantastic, thrash never needed that to create some spectacular."

Within three years after its release in 1987, The Legacy had sold over 150,000 copies in the U.S.

Accolades
The album was also included on "Frank's Favorite Records of 1987" on Metal Injection. 
In 2008, Decibel inducted the album into their hall of fame.
They later ranked the album as Testament's third best.
In 2015, VH1 listed the album as one of the greatest thrash debuts.
Loudwire gave the album numerous accolades:
In 2013, they called it the 13th best debut metal album of all time.
In 2015, they ranked the album number three on their top ten list of "Thrash Albums NOT Released by the Big 4".
In 2016, they ranked the album as Testament's best.
In 2017, they listed the album as the 11th best thrash metal album of all time.
In 2020, they included the album on their list of the best debut thrash albums of all time.

Track listing

Personnel
Writing, performance and production credits are adapted from the album liner notes.
Testament
 Chuck Billy – vocals
 Eric Peterson – guitars
 Alex Skolnick – guitars
 Greg Christian – bass
 Louie Clemente – drums

Production
 Alex Perialas – production, engineering
 Marsha Zazula – production (exec.)
 Jon Zazula – production (exec.)
 Tom Coyne – mastering

Artwork and design
 Eric Peterson – logo concept
 Bill Benson – logo art
 Alexis Olson – cover concept
 Dan Muro – cover photography, special effects

References

External links 
 

1987 debut albums
Albums produced by Alex Perialas
Atlantic Records albums
Megaforce Records albums
Testament (band) albums